Anand Dabak is an electrical engineer with Texas Instruments. He was named a Fellow of the Institute of Electrical and Electronics Engineers (IEEE) in 2014 for his contributions to wireless and power-line communications.

References

Living people
Fellow Members of the IEEE
21st-century American engineers
Year of birth missing (living people)
Place of birth missing (living people)
American electrical engineers